Utyanka is a rural locality (a selo) in Utyansky Selsoviet, Khabarsky District, Altai Krai, Russia. The population was 989 as of 2013. It was founded in 1891. There are 13 streets.

Geography 
Utyanka is located near the Burla river, 8 km southwest of Khabary (the district's administrative centre) by road. Alekseyevka is the nearest rural locality.

References 

Rural localities in Khabarsky District